Rubén Beloki Irribarren is a Basque pelota defensive player, often considered one of the best in the history of the sport. He was born in Burlada on 8 August 1974. 
His brother Alberto Beloki is also a professional pelotari known as Beloki II.

Professional career
Beloki won The Championship of Spain in 1991 and 1992, and a golden medal on 1992 Summer Olympics demonstration, four Hand-pelota 1st championships (1995, 1998, 1999 and 2001), turning in the youngest player to win a txapela at the age of 20. The doubles championships of 1996 and 2003, and a total of 5 subchampionships in the same category.

Hand-pelota (1st)

Doubles-Pelota

Hand-pelota (2nd)

Personal life 
Rubén Beloki lived in Burlada until 29. After his marriage he moved to Gorraiz, where he lives with his wife and three children.
A square and a fronton in the town are named after him.

Sources

External links 
Beloki's Bio at Manista.com

Spanish pelotaris
1974 births
Living people
Pelotaris from Navarre
People from Cuenca de Pamplona